is a 2011 Japanese animated action fantasy film based on the Pretty Cure franchise created by Izumi Todo. The film is directed by Takashi Otsuka, written by Isao Murayama, and produced by Toei Animation. The film was released in Japan on March 19, 2011.

Marking the third entry to the Pretty Cure All Stars crossover film series, as well as the final installment to the DX trilogy, the Suite PreCure team joins the previous Pretty Cure teams on protecting the Prism Flower from evil forces.

Plot
The Suite PreCure team: Hibiki and Kanade arrive at the mall, and encounter HeartCatch PreCure! team: Tsubomi, Erika, Itsuki and Yuri, who are holding a fashion show, with the other Pretty Cures present. Suddenly, millions of fairies and mascots fall from the sky. Worried, Coco and Nutts wonder if something had happened, and then the villains Dark Witch, Freezen and Frozen, Sirloin, Shadow and Mushiban, Toymajin and Count Salamander appears before them. The Cures transform, and then demand why they have reappeared. The Dark Witch responds that it is due to Lord Black Hole, which was created by the evil energies from their respective villains' defeat, as well as creating Fusion and Bottom. Aiming to get the Prism Flower, the villains transport the Cures through different dimensions.

Cures Black, Bloom, Dream, Peach, Blossom and Melody end up in a desert, and Cures White, Egret, Mint, Aqua, Berry, Marine and Rhythm end up in a wrecked ship surrounded by the ocean, while Shiny Luminous, Milky Rose, Cures Rouge, Lemonade, Passion, Sunshine and Moonlight on a giant board game. Despite their mishaps, they individually managed to escape and return to Earth. All their respective teams defeat the villains, while Melody and Rhythm finishes Freezen and Frozen. However, Lord Black Hole arrives and attacks, causing the Cures to lose their transformation devices. While despair, Coco and Nuts asks to use the Prism Flower's powers, but in process of the mascots will never meet the Cures again, as it is the bridge between their world and Earth. All is saddened, but Hibiki encourages everyone to move forward. The Cures plead the Prism Flower, and with its power and the Miracle Lights, they all transform into their upgraded selves, and combine their powers and attacks Lord Black Hole. Despite his defeat, the girls are saddened with the terms of their loss of their mascot.

Weeks later, the girls are playing at the park, and suddenly, their individual mascot appears. Chypre tells them that the Tree of Hearts had bloomed a new Prism Flower, which means that they will not be separated again.

Voice cast
Suite PreCure cast
Ami Koshimizu as Hibiki Hojo/Cure Melody
Fumiko Orikasa as Kanade Minamino/Cure Rhythm
Kotono Mitsuishi as Hummy

HeartCatch PreCure! cast
Nana Mizuki as Tsubomi Hanasaki/Cure Blossom
Fumie Mizusawa as Erika Kurumi/Cure Marine
Houko Kuwashima as Itsuki Miyoudouin/Cure Sunshine
Aya Hisakawa as Yuri Tsukikage/Cure Moonlight
Taeko Kawata as Chypre
Motoko Kumai as Coffret
Kokoro Kikuchi as Potpurri

Fresh Pretty Cure! cast
Kanae Oki as Love Momozono/Cure Peach
Eri Kitamura as Miki Aono/Cure Berry
Akiko Nakagawa as Inori Yamabuki/Cure Pine
Yuka Komatsu as Setsuna Higashi/Cure Passion
Taiki Matsuno as Tart
Satomi Kōrogi as Chiffon

Yes! PreCure 5 GoGo! cast
Yūko Sanpei as Nozomi Yumehara/Cure Dream
Junko Takeuchi as Rin Natsuki/Cure Rouge
Mariya Ise as Urara Kasugano/Cure Lemonade
Ai Nagano as Komachi Akimoto/Cure Mint
Ai Maeda as Karen Minazuki/Cure Aqua
Eri Sendai as Milk/Kurumi Mimino/Milky Rose
Takeshi Kusao as Coco
Miyu Irino as Natts
Romi Park as Syrup

Futari wa Pretty Cure Splash Star cast
Orie Kimoto as Saki Hyuuga/Cure Bloom/Cure Bright
Atsuko Enomoto as Mai Mishou/Cure Egret/Cure Windy
Kappei Yamaguchi as Flappy
Miyu Matsuki as Choppy
Yuriko Fuchizaki as Moop
Akemi Okamura as Fuup

Futari wa Pretty Cure Max Heart cast
Yōko Honna as Nagisa Misumi/Cure Black
Yukana as Honoka Yukishiro/Cure White
Rie Tanaka as Hikari Kujo/Shiny Luminous
Tomokazu Seki as Mepple
Akiko Yajima as Mipple
Haruna Ikezawa as Pollun
Asuka Tanii as Lulun

Film characters
Koichi Yamadera as Lord Black Hole
Masako Katsuki as Dark Witch
Takeshi Kusao as Freezen
Nobuyuki Hiyama as Frozen
Show Hayami as Sirloin
Romi Park as Shadow
Akio Otsuka as Mushiban
Kōzō Shioya as Toymajin
Keiji Fujiwara as Count Salamander

Production
It was announced in October 2010 that the next Pretty Cure All Stars film was in development. The majority of the key staff from previous Pretty Cure All Stars DX duology returned: Takashi Otsuka is directing at Toei Animation, Isao Murayama is providing the screenplay, and Mitsuru Aoyama is serving as a character designer and animation direction for the film, while Naoki Satō is solely composing the music for DX3.

Release
The film was released in theaters in Japan on March 19, 2011. Prior to its release, the production team edited out a scene for its theatrical release, due to it being reminiscent to the earthquake and tsunami that happened weeks earlier.

Reception
The film dropped from number 8 to 12 out of top 10 in the Japanese box office in its sixth week.

Notes

References

External links
 

2010s Japanese films
2011 anime films
Pretty Cure films
Toei Animation films
Japanese magical girl films
Crossover anime and manga
Films scored by Naoki Satō